Milaim Rama (born 29 February 1976) is a former professional footballer who spent most of his career playing for Thun. In addition to Thun, he also played for FC Augsburg, Schaffhausen. Born in SFR Yugoslavia, he represented the Switzerland national team at international level.

International career
Rama had the right to represent two countries at the international level, such as Albania or Switzerland, with the latter he made his debut on 20 August 2003 in a friendly match against France after coming on as a substitute at 46th minute in place of Stéphane Chapuisat, becoming the first Kosovan to debut with Switzerland. His last international match was on 21 June 2004 in UEFA Euro 2004 group stage again against France.

Personal life
Rama was born in Viti, SFR Yugoslavia to Kosovo Albanian parents from the village Zhiti near Viti. At the age of 17, he immigrated to Switzerland and in 2003 received the Swiss passport. Rama is the father of Kosovo international Alketa Rama.

References

External links

1976 births
Living people
People from Viti, Kosovo
Kosovan emigrants to Switzerland
Swiss men's footballers
Kosovan footballers
Association football forwards
Switzerland international footballers
UEFA Euro 2004 players
Swiss Challenge League players
Swiss Super League players
Regionalliga players
FC Thun players
FC Schaffhausen players
FC Augsburg players
Swiss expatriate footballers
Kosovan expatriate footballers
Swiss expatriate sportspeople in Germany
Kosovan expatriate sportspeople in Germany
Expatriate footballers  in Germany